Woodford is an unincorporated community located in Carter County, Oklahoma, United States. The townsite plat and cemetery are located within Section 34, Township 2 South, Range 1 West of the Indian Meridian.  Its elevation is 932 feet. The zipcode is 73401.  Woodford has its own telephone exchange, serviced by the Chickasaw Telephone Company.  Phone numbers in Woodford are in the format 580-561-XXXX. The Woodford area had its own school district in the past, but it was closed as the community dwindled in population. Students in the area today attend school in the nearby towns of Springer, Lone Grove, or Fox.

History
A post office was established at Woodford, Indian Territory on February 4, 1884.  It was named for Noah L. Woodford, a prominent Chickasaw Indian.

At the time of its founding, Woodford was located in Pickens County, Chickasaw Nation.

A history of Woodford was compiled by the Oklahoma history class at Woodford High School in 1930 (unpublished manuscript).

The population of Woodford had already started to decline by 1930.  In 1940, the census enumerated 138 residents.  The school district and at least one church closed in the 1950s.  The last remaining store closed in the late 1980s.  The community still supports a volunteer fire department, however.  Woodford is included in the book "Ghost Towns of Oklahoma".

References

Unincorporated communities in Oklahoma
Populated places in Carter County, Oklahoma